DJ Paul & Juicy J:Underground Vol. 3: Kings of Memphis is the third volume in the "Underground" series of albums released by Three 6 Mafia. The songs are either previously unreleased songs from the early to mid-1990s or songs that didn't make the final cut for their album, When the Smoke Clears: Sixty 6, Sixty 1.

Track listing
All tracks produced by DJ Paul and Juicy J.
 Talkin' (DJ Paul and Juicy J)
 Fuck What U Heard (DJ Paul, Juicy J, Lord Infamous and Crunchy Black)
 M.E.M.P.H.I.S. Part 2 (Remix) (DJ Paul, Juicy J, Project Pat, Lord Infamous, Crunchy Black, La Chat, Koopsta Knicca, T-Rock and MC Mack)
 Da Summa (DJ Paul, Juicy J, Lord Infamous, Crunchy Black, Gangsta Boo and Koopsta Knicca)
 Smokin on Da Dro (DJ Paul, La Chat, Lord Infamous, Juicy J and T-Rock)
 Powder (higher version) (Lil E)
 Grab Tha Gauge (DJ Paul, Juicy J, Lord Infamous and Gangsta Boo)
 Wonabees (DJ Paul, Juicy J, Lord Infamous, Crunchy Black Gangsta Boo and Project Pat)
 Lock Down (DJ Paul, Juicy J, Lord Infamous and Gangsta Boo)
 Jealous Azz Bitch (DJ Paul, Juicy J, Lord Infamous and Gangsta Boo)
 Niggas Down 2 Make Endz (Lil E)
 South Memphis Bitch (DJ Paul and Lord Infamous)
 Pass That Junt (DJ Paul and Lord Infamous)
 Love to Make a Stang (DJ Paul, Lord Infamous and Juicy J)
 Sleep (DJ Paul, Juicy J, Lord Infamous, Crunchy Black, and Gangsta Boo)
 Mindstate (DJ Paul, Juicy J, Lord Infamous, Crunchy Black, Gangsta Boo and Koopsta Knicca)

2000 albums
Three 6 Mafia albums
Gangsta rap albums by American artists
Loud Records albums
Albums produced by DJ Paul
Albums produced by Juicy J